Lexham Gardens is a street in South Kensington, London.

Although somewhat irregular in shape, the largest part of the street runs west to east from Earls Court Road to Cromwell Road.

The Embassy of Bosnia and Herzegovina, London is at 5–7.

Lexham Gardens figures in Part 6 of the BBC miniseries (1979) based on the novel Tinker Tailor Soldier Spy.

Garden
Sir Cyril Taylor, the educator and social entrepreneur, purchased the freehold of a one-acre garden square, near to his London home in Lexham Gardens, by auction in 1989.  With the assistance of designer Wilf Simms, he redesigned and replanted the garden, and saved it from the hands of property developers who wanted to build an underground car park underneath. In the garden's first summer of 1991, Lexham Gardens was awarded first prize in the All London Garden Squares Competition, competing against entries from 100 other squares.

Notable residents
Notable residents included the cricketer Learie Constantine, at no 101.

Sir Alexander Carmichael Bruce, the second Assistant Commissioner "A" of the Metropolitan Police, lived at no 82.

Sir Juland Danvers, administrator and civil servant in India, lived at no. 103 after his retirement.

The civil engineer Horace Bell lived and died at no 114.

Kenny Everett, the comedian, radio DJ and television entertainer lived at no 91 from 1981 to his death in 1995.

Derek Nimmo, character actor, producer and author lived in Lexham Gardens.

The actor Denholm Elliott was born at no. 48.

On 15 June 1952, Special Operations Executive (SOE) agent Christine Granville was stabbed to death in the Shellbourne Hotel, 1 Lexham Gardens, by an "obsessed" Dennis George Muldowney, who was hanged on 30 September.

References

External links

Streets in the Royal Borough of Kensington and Chelsea